Chaleunsouk Oudomphanh (born September 24, 1978) is a Laotian athlete specializing in the 100 metres.  He is 5'9" and approximately 143 lbs.

Participating in the 2004 Summer Olympics, he achieved seventh place in his 100 metres heat with a time of 11.30, thus failing to secure qualification to the second round. Oudomphonh was also the flag bearer at the Opening Ceremony on August 13.

References

External links
 

1978 births
Living people
Olympic athletes of Laos
Laotian male sprinters
Athletes (track and field) at the 2004 Summer Olympics